Arnaud Cotture (born 9 August 1995) is a Swiss professional basketball player. He currently plays for Fribourg Olympic of the Swiss Basketball League.

He represented Switzerland's national basketball team at the EuroBasket 2017 qualification, where he was Switzerland's best shot blocker.

References

External links
 FIBA profile
 Real GM profile
 ScoutBasketball.com profile
 Eurobasket.com profile

1995 births
Living people
Fribourg Olympic players
Lions de Genève players
People from Martigny
Power forwards (basketball)
Swiss men's basketball players
Sportspeople from Valais